A balmacaan is a "loose, full overcoat with raglan sleeves, originally made of rough woolen cloth." It is named after an estate near Inverness, Scotland, and is a single-breasted coat, often a raincoat. To decrease risk of water penetrating the coat, the number of seams is reduced by bringing the sleeve to the collar rather than to the shoulder as usual. A balmacaan has  raglan sleeves and a Prussian collar, and is usually made of tweed or gabardine.

References

Scottish clothing